HD 88955 is a single, white-hued star in the southern constellation of Vela. It can be viewed with the naked eye, having an apparent visual magnitude of 3.85. It is moving further from the Earth with a heliocentric radial velocity of +7 km/s. Bayesian analysis suggests HD 88955 is a member of the Argus Association, a group of co-moving stars usually associated with the IC 2391 open cluster.

This is an A-type main-sequence star with a stellar classification of A2 V. It is about 410 million years old with a projected rotational velocity of 100 km/s. The star has 2.17 times the mass of the Sun and 2.11 times the Sun's radius.

References

A-type main-sequence stars
Circumstellar disks
Vela (constellation)
Velorum, q
Durchmusterung objects
088955
050191
4023